Military airspace is any area in which military aircraft are present and participate in a variety of activities. There are many kinds of airspace.

Military operating areas
A military operations area (MOA) is a zone in which military aircraft conduct non-hazardous exercises. It is highly recommended that pilots check for information on the MOA before proceeding into the zone.

Controlled firing zones
Controlled firing zones are operated in such a way that they do not interfere with and/or pose a threat to civilian aircraft.

Alert areas
Alert areas are zones where unusual air exercises like pilot training are performed. Once again pilots are advised to contact the area prior to entering.

References

Air traffic control